C1 Television, or C1, is a television broadcaster in Mongolia.

History
Channel 1 television was founded on 24 April 2006. According to the station, it is the first in Mongolia to use fully digital video processing.

TV programming 
C1 Television broadcasts a variety of programming. The following are noteworthy:
 News. C1 gets its foreign news clips from Reuters, and its domestic news from its own crew.
 Sport. C1 gets its sport news from the ESPN and Eurosport. C1 was the only official Mongolian broadcaster of 2010 FIFA World Cup in South Africa and aired all the matches live. The broadcasting was sponsored by several prominent local corporations that include Khan bank and Skytel among others.
Entertainment. C1 broadcasts Mongolian Movies, Talk shows, and Movie News. Also C1 broadcasts Bizarre Foods with Andrew Zimmern, Ben 10, and Skins (TV series).

See also
Media of Mongolia
Communications in Mongolia

External links
 

Television companies of Mongolia
Television channels and stations established in 2006